The Roewe RX5 is a compact crossover SUV that is manufactured by SAIC Motor under the Roewe brand. The RX5 is available as a petrol-powered RX5 variant, a plug-in hybrid eRX5 variant and a pure electric ERX5 variant. The facelift model is called the RX5 Plus, and a slightly larger second generation model called the RX5 Max is sold alongside the RX5 Plus. The RX5 Max is available as a petrol-powered RX5 Max variant and a plug-in hybrid RX5 eMax variant. The RX5 Max was facelifted for the 2021 model year.



First generation (2016) 

On 9 June 2016, Alibaba officially unveiled the Roewe RX5, its first “Internet car” in collaboration with SAIC. Priced upwards of RMB 148,800 ($22,300) when deliveries started in August 2016.

eRX5 and ERX5
The RX5 came in three different powertrains, including the petrol engined RX5, the PHEV eRX5, and the fully electric ERX5. The capital "E" in Roewe's naming system indicates fully electric while the lower case "e" indicates hybrid. 

Exterior styling differences are mainly on the front view, with the eRX5 and ERX5 having larger grilles and grille mounted front license plates. The only styling difference between the eRX5 and ERX5 are the different inner headlamp setup and graphics.

MG RX5
The RX5 is also sold under the MG marque, though only with petrol powertrains. The 2.0 turbo comes only with all wheel drive. It was launched in the Middle East and the Philippines in February 2018. It is also sold in Cambodia, Iran and South America.

RX5 Plus 
In April 2020, SAIC released the Roewe RX5 Plus. It is essentially the facelift version of the standard RX5. It featured a new front fascia, including a new headlights, a new grille shape which adds one diamond like woven shape with a new black background Roewe logo, and a refreshed rear fascia.

RX5 Plus facelift
The Roewe RX5 Plus received another facelift in 2021 mainly updating the front grilles. The 2021 model was unveiled at 2021 Auto Shanghai.

Powertrains

Second generation, RX5 Max (2019) 

The Roewe RX5 MAX was previewed during the 2019 Shanghai Auto Show, as the Roewe Max pre production concept. 

The model was later revealed as the Roewe RX5 Max. The model is designed to be a larger and more upmarket alternative to the RX5.

Powertrain
The Roewe RX5 Max is powered by the same engine of the Roewe RX5, including the 1.5 litre turbo inline four engine, and the 2.0 litre turbo inline four engine. Transmission options include a six speed manual gearbox, a six speed automatic gearbox, a six speed dual clutch transmission.

RX5 eMAX
The RX5 eMAX is the plug-in hybrid version of the RX5 Max crossover. It is powered by a 1.5 liter turbo engine and an electric motor. The transmission is a 10-speed transmission by SAIC.

2021 facelift
The Roewe RX5 Max received a facelift for the 2021 model year and was launched during the 2020 Guangzhou Auto Show in November 2020. The facelift carries over the same powertrain while featuring a full-width headlamp across the front fascia and the updated Roewe logo.

2022 facelift
The Roewe RX5 Max received another facelift for the 2022 model year and was launched in December 2021. The update completely restyled the front end and slightly revised the rear end styling.

Third generation (2022) 

Images of the third generation Roewe RX5 was released in March 2022. The third generation RX5 is powered by a 1.5 liter turbo engine codenamed 15FDE producing a maximum power output of  mated to a 7-speed wet dual clutch transmission. The engine is the updated version of the second generation Blue Core powertrain of SAIC.

eRX5
The third generation Roewe RX5 is also available as a plug-in hybrid variant called the Roewe eRX5. The transmission is a 10-speed automatic gearbox.

References

External links

 
 (Philippines)

Compact sport utility vehicles
Crossover sport utility vehicles
Hybrid sport utility vehicles
Production electric cars
2010s cars
RX5
Cars introduced in 2016
Front-wheel-drive vehicles
Cars of China